Uncinaria sanguinis is a species of nematode. It is a parasite of the Australian sea lion, found in South Australia.

References

Strongylida
Invertebrates of Australia
Parasites of carnivores
Nematodes described in 2014